Fiscal is a parish in Amares Municipality in the Braga District in Portugal. The population in 2011 was 718, in an area of 3.90 km².

Fiscal is the birthplace of Portuguese singer António Ribeiro, mostly known as António Variações. Being homaged with a bust located in his birthplace of Fiscal and the name of a street in the city of Amares.

References

Freguesias of Amares